Federica Mogherini (born 16 June 1973) is an Italian politician who served as High Representative of the Union for Foreign Affairs and Security Policy and Vice-President of the European Commission from 2014 to 2019. She previously served as Italy's Minister for Foreign Affairs and International Cooperation from February 2014 to October 2014, in the centre-left Renzi Cabinet. She was a Member of the Chamber of Deputies (MP) from 2008 to 2014. In 2020 she was appointed rector of the College of Europe, a post-graduate university for European studies in Bruges (Belgium) and Natolin (Poland).

She is a member of the Democratic Party, part of the Party of European Socialists, a political faction made up of centre-left national political parties in the EU and Norway.

Early life and education 
Federica Mogherini was born on 16 June 1973 in Rome, Italy, to the family of the film director and set designer Flavio Mogherini (1922–1994).

Mogherini attended the Sapienza University of Rome where she studied Political Science graduating with a specialization in Political Philosophy with a final dissertation on Islam and politics, which she wrote while she was on the Erasmus programme at Sciences Po Aix in Aix-en-Provence, France.

Political career

Early beginnings

From 1988 Mogherini was a member of the Italian Communist Youth Federation. In 1996, she joined the Youth Left after the dissolution of the Italian Communist Party and its transformation into a Social Democratic Party. In 2001, she became a member of the National Council of the Democrats of the Left (DS), later serving on its National Executive Board and Political Committee. In 2003, she started working at the DS's Foreign Affairs Section, where she was given responsibility for relations with international movements and parties, later becoming the team's coordinator; after that she was given responsibility for Foreign Affairs and International Relations on the staff of DS Party chairman Piero Fassino. In this role she oversaw the policies on Afghanistan and Iraq, as well as the Middle East peace process. Mogherini was in charge of maintaining relations with the Party of European Socialists, the Socialist International and other left-wing parties.

After the formation of the Italian Democratic Party (PD), on 4 November 2007, Mogherini was appointed to the staff of its founding chairman Walter Veltroni.

Member of Parliament, 2008–14
In 2008, Mogherini was elected to the Chamber of Deputies, representing the constituency of Veneto. Serving in the 16th legislature, she became secretary of its Defence Committee, a member of the Italian parliamentary delegation to the Council of Europe, and of Italy's parliamentary delegation to the Western European Union.

On 24 February 2009, she was appointed to the staff of the incoming chairman of the PD Dario Franceschini, with responsibility for equal opportunity. After that she was notable as a member of Franceschini's faction (Area Democratica). She has also served as Vice-President of the Italy-USA Foundation.

In February 2013, Mogherini was returned to parliament for the Emilia-Romagna constituency. During the 17th Italian legislature she served again on the Defence Committee (replacing Lapo Pistelli after he was appointed Vice-Minister for Foreign Affairs), on the Committee on Foreign Affairs and on the Italian delegation to the Parliamentary Assembly of NATO, and later its president from April 2013. On 1 August 2013, she was elected as head of the Italian delegation to the Parliamentary Assembly for NATO.

On 9 December 2013, Matteo Renzi, the new chairman of the PD, appointed Mogherini to his staff, with the responsibility of European relations.

Around this time Mogherini voiced her support for the Campaign for the Establishment of a United Nations Parliamentary Assembly, an organisation which campaigns for democratic reformation of the United Nations, and the creation of a more accountable international political system.

Mogherini was a Fellow of the German Marshall Fund of the United States.

Minister of Foreign Affairs of Italy, 2014
Mogherini joined the Renzi Cabinet as Minister of Foreign Affairs, the third woman after Susanna Agnelli and Emma Bonino to hold this post. Her first public engagement following her appointment was to meet, along with Italy's Defence Minister, the wives of Massimiliano Latorre and Salvatore Girone, the two Italian marines detained in India after the Enrica Lexie incident.

Under her direction, the Foreign Ministry worked for the release of Mariam Ibrahim. Italy's good relations with Sudan helped in securing the release of this Sudanese woman who was finally permitted to fly to Italy on an Italian government plane.

In July 2014, Mogherini expressed support for Israel's right to defend itself during the 2014 Israel–Gaza conflict. She stated: "The repeated rocket strikes on Israel warrant the firmest possible condemnation; all attacks on civilian areas must stop immediately."

EU High Representative, 2014–2019 

In July 2014, given the large number of Italian MEPs belonging to the S&D group following the 2014 European election, the European Council considered her as a candidate for the position of High Representative of the European Union for Foreign Affairs and Security Policy, in Jean-Claude Juncker's new Commission. On 13 July 2014, the Financial Times among other European newspapers reported that her nomination proposal had been opposed by the Baltic states and several Central-European countries, including Latvia, Estonia, Lithuania and Poland, where her stance towards Russia concerning the Ukrainian crisis was considered to be too soft. Sweden, Ireland, Netherlands and the United Kingdom raised concerns also, claiming the position should be filled by someone from the center-right and by a candidate from outside Germany, France and Italy.

Nonetheless, on 2 August 2014, Italian Prime Minister Matteo Renzi formally nominated her by letter to EC President-elect Jean-Claude Juncker, as Italy's official candidate for EU Commissioner.

On 30 August, Europe's socialist Prime Ministers met prior to the convening of the European Council, at which she received the approval of the Party of European Socialists. On the same day the President Herman Van Rompuy announced that the European Council had decided to appoint the Italian Minister as its new High Representative, effective from 1 November 2014. The group of commissioners involved in external relations — neighborhood and EU enlargement, trade, development, emergency and humanitarian aid, migration, energy and transport — meets monthly, with Mogherini in the chair.

At her first press conference she declared her efforts will be devoted to establishing discussions between Russia and Ukraine to solve the crisis between the two countries.

In 2015, Mogherini won praise for her role in negotiating the Joint Comprehensive Plan of Action, an international agreement on the nuclear program of Iran, and along with Iranian Foreign Minister Mohammad Javad Zarif was the one to announce the accord to the world. In 2016, she appointed chief negotiator Helga Schmid as Secretary General of the European External Action Service (EEAS), following the resignation of Alain Le Roy.

Since 2015, Mogherini has been serving as a member of the European Commission’s High-level Group of Personalities on Defence Research chaired by Elżbieta Bieńkowska.

2016 Global Strategy
In 2016 the EU adopted the European Union Global Strategy, drawn up by Mogherini, thereby replacing the 2003 European Security Strategy.

2017 visit to India
In April of 2017, Mogherini paid her first visit to India in an official capacity as EU representative, discussing issues including climate change and anti-terrorism.

2017 JCPOA talks
In October 2017, Mogherini announced plans to argue the EU case for America to remain supportive of the Joint Comprehensive Plan of Action (JCPOA), the "Iran nuclear deal", by holding talks with the Trump administration in Washington DC following Trump's Denial of Recertification.

Later career 
In 2019, United Nations Secretary-General António Guterres appointed Mogherini as co-chair of the High Level-Panel on Internal Displacement, alongside Donald Kaberuka.

In April 2020, she gave notice of her intention to apply for the position of rector of the College of Europe. The French newspaper Libération criticised this decision, because Mogherini did not have the academic qualifications needed for the job.  According to the newspaper, there was a conflict of interests in this matter, as the College of Europe is funded at 50% by the European Commission.
Mogherini became rector on 1 September 2020.

Political positions

Relations with North-African countries
In 2017, Mogherini stirred controversy over her statement that the trade agreements between Morocco and the EU would not be affected by the 2016 ruling by the European Court of Justice on the scope of trade with Morocco. This ruling confirmed that bilateral trade deals, such as the EU–Morocco Fisheries Partnership Agreement, cover only agricultural produce and fishing products originating within the internationally recognized borders of Morocco, thus explicitly excluding any product sourced from Western Sahara or its territorial waters. The international community, including the EU, unanimously rejects Morocco's territorial claim to Western Sahara.

Relations with Iran
Speaking at a briefing with New Zealand's Foreign Minister Winston Peters, on the first ever EU high-representative official visit, Mogherini challenged U.S. sanctions on Iran, stating that the EU is encouraging small and medium size enterprises in particular to increase business with and in Iran as part of something that is for the EU a "Security Priority".

Relations with the Middle East 
Mogherini has expressed that she wants the EU to play a leading role in trying to restart Israeli-Palestinian peace talks after a U.S.-brokered process foundered in April 2014. She visited the region within days of starting her new job. She pushed to revitalise the Middle East Quartet – together with the United Nations, the United States, and Russia – and to involve key Arab countries in relaunching the peace process: the first "Quartet plus" meeting, with Egypt, Jordan, Saudi Arabia and the Arab League, took place on the sides of the UN General Assembly in New York, on 30 September 2014.

In her capacity of EU High Representative she coordinated the last rounds of negotiations on Iran's nuclear programme, which led to an agreement on 14 July 2015. US Secretary of State John Kerry praised her for "expertly coordinating international efforts during the final stage" of the talks.

Mogherini opposed the Saudi Arabian-led intervention in Yemen, saying: "I'm convinced that military action is not a solution."

Mogherini opposed President Donald Trump's decision to recognize Jerusalem as Israel's capital.

On 19 March 2018, in response to the Turkish invasion of northern Syria, Mogherini criticized Turkey, saying that international efforts in Syria are supposed to be "aiming at de-escalating the military activities and not escalating them." Mogherini issued a declaration on behalf of the EU on 9 October 2019 stating that "In light of the Turkish military operation in north-east Syria, the EU reaffirms that a sustainable solution to the Syrian conflict cannot be achieved militarily."

Relations with Russia
In January 2015, Mogherini circulated a discussion paper among EU foreign ministers exploring a potential rapprochement with Russia, including a pathway to ease some economic sanctions against the country during the Ukraine crisis and opening dialogue on a range of topics such as visas and energy policy; the proposal drew a harsh response from the United Kingdom and Poland as the fighting intensified in eastern Ukraine. In February 2017, Mogherini said that "as long as the Minsk agreements are not fully implemented, [anti-Russian] sanctions would remain in place". In March 2017, dozens of journalists, analysts, and politicians signed an open letter, initiated by Czech non-governmental organisation European Values Think-Tank, criticising Mogherini's response to Russia, saying she was "trying to avoid naming Russia as the main creator of hostile disinformation" and "constantly [appeasing] Russian aggression."

On 27 April 2017, on her first official visit to Russia, Mogherini met with Sergei Lavrov. Their discussion covered the implementation of the Minsk Agreement, the Annexation of Crimea, homophobic discrimination in Chechnya, and other topics. Mogherini said that she supported policies in the spirit of "cooperation rather than confrontation".

Relations with China 
On 11 September 2018, Mogherini raised the issue of Xinjiang re-education camps and human rights abuses against the Uyghur Muslim minority in European Parliament.

Relations with the United States 

An admirer of the United States, Mogherini told Reuters in 2014 that one day she would like to work there. In the negotiations on a Transatlantic Trade and Investment Partnership, she pushed for an energy chapter, arguing that it would "set a benchmark" in terms of transparent, rules-based energy markets to the rest of the world.

Following the election of Donald Trump as US President and his support of Brexit, Mogherini criticized Trump for interfering in internal European matters, stating "We do not interfere in US politics … and Europeans expect that America does not interfere in European politics."

In June 2018, Mogherini issued the statement that EU praised the 2018 North Korea–United States summit between US President Donald Trump and North Korean leader Kim Jong-un. It is "crucial and necessary step" for denuclearization of the Korean peninsula. EU will be ready to "facilitate and support the follow-on negotiations and other steps" for a peace settlement.

Relations with Central Asia
Mogherini advocated for a stronger partnership between the European Union and Central Asia. On 7 July 2019 she presented the new European Union Strategy for Central Asia during the 15th EU-Central Asia Ministerial Meeting in Kyrgyz capital Bishkek. On the same day, she was awarded Kazakhstan's Order Dostyk of the First Degree for her personal contribution to the development of friendly relations between Kazakhstan and the EU.

Islam in Europe
Since her appointment to the European Commission, Mogherini has stated publicly that Islam is part of Europe's history and future. In a speech in Brussels on 24 June 2015, she said that "Islam holds a place in our Western societies. Islam belongs in Europe. It holds a place in Europe's history, in our culture, in our food and—what matters most—in Europe's present and future. Like it or not, this is the reality." She added: "I am not afraid to say that political Islam should be part of the picture. Religion plays a role in politics – not always for good, not always for bad. Religion can be part of the process. What makes the difference is whether the process is democratic or not."

Some analysts claim that Mogherini's speech has been misquoted. For example, according to columnist Klaus Jurgens, Mogherini believes that "political Islam should be part of the equation in fighting terror and in particular the Islamic State in Iraq and the Levant" and "she did not say that political Islam should become Europe's new masterplan".

Other activities
 Africa Europe Foundation (AEF), Member of the High-Level Group of Personalities on Africa-Europe Relations (since 2020)
 Friends of Europe, Member of the Board of Trustees (since 2020)
 International Crisis Group (ICG), Member of the Board of Trustees (since 2019)
 Istituto Affari Internazionali (IAI), Member 
 Generation Unlimited, Member of the Board (since 2018)
 Fight Impunity, Member of the Honorary Board (–2022)
 German Marshall Fund, Fellow
 European Leadership Network (ELN), Member
 Preparatory Commission for the Comprehensive Nuclear-Test-Ban Treaty Organization, Member of the Group of Eminent Persons
 Munich Security Conference, Member of the Advisory Council

Recognition
 2017 – Hessian Peace Prize
 2017 – Kaiser-Otto-Preis
 2018 – Honorary doctorate, University of Tampere

See also
List of foreign ministers in 2017
List of current foreign ministers

References

External links 
 
 
 
  Page in the Chamber Web Site
 
 

|-

|-

1973 births
21st-century Italian politicians
21st-century Italian women politicians
Democratic Party (Italy) politicians
Female foreign ministers
Foreign ministers of Italy
Grand Officers of the Order of Merit of the Italian Republic
Italian European Commissioners
Italian women diplomats
Living people
Marxist feminists
Members of the Chamber of Deputies (Italy)
Politicians from Rome
Politicians of Emilia-Romagna
Renzi Cabinet
Sapienza University of Rome alumni
Women European Commissioners
Women government ministers of Italy
Italian socialist feminists
European Commissioners 2014–2019
Women members of the Chamber of Deputies (Italy)